Several theorems proved by the French mathematician Claude Chevalley bear his name. 

 Chevalley–Shephard–Todd theorem in invariant theory of finite groups.
 Chevalley–Warning theorem concerning solvability of polynomial equations over finite fields.
 Chevalley restriction theorem identifying the invariants of the adjoint action of a semisimple algebraic group with the invariants of its Weyl group acting on the Cartan subalgebra.
 Chevalley's structure theorem on algebraic groups: if G is an algebraic group then it contains a unique closed normal subgroup N such that N is affine and the quotient G/N is an abelian variety.
 Chevalley's theorem on constructible sets.